Chagda is a rural locality (a selo), the only inhabited locality, and the administrative center of Chagdinsky Rural Okrug of Aldansky District in the Sakha Republic, Russia, located  from Aldan, the administrative center of the district. Its population as of the 2010 Census was 218, down from 368 recorded during the 2002 Census and 682 recorded during the 1989 Census.

Geography
Chagda is located on the banks of the Aldan River, east of the mouth of the Yungyuele.

History
Chagda had urban status until May 18, 2001.

References

Notes

Sources
Official website of the Sakha Republic. Registry of the Administrative-Territorial Divisions of the Sakha Republic. Aldansky District. 

Rural localities in Aldansky District

